The men's 800 metres at the 2014 IAAF World Indoor Championships took place on 7 and 9 March 2014. Poland's Marcin Lewandowski originally won the bronze medal, but a single step on the infield led to his disqualification and the promotion of Great Britain's Andrew Osagie to the third podium position.

Medalists

Records

Qualification standards

Schedule

Results

Heats
Qualification: The winner of each heat (Q) and next 3 fastest (q) qualified.

Final

References

800 metres
800 metres at the World Athletics Indoor Championships